Bachbusters is a studio album by Don Dorsey containing the music of Johann Sebastian Bach as realized on digital and other authentic period synthesizers.

Track listing
 Italian Concerto, for solo keyboard in F major, I. Allegro (Clavier-Übung II/1), BWV 971 (BC L7)
 Italian Concerto, for solo keyboard in F major, II. Andante (Clavier-Übung II/1), BWV 971 (BC L7)
 Italian Concerto, for solo keyboard in F major, III. Presto (Clavier-Übung II/1), BWV 971 (BC L7)
 Two-Part Invention, for keyboard No. 1 in C major, BWV 772 (BC L42)
 Three-Part Invention (Sinfonia), for keyboard No. 1 in C major, BWV 787 (BC L42)
 Two-Part Invention, for keyboard No. 8 in F major, BWV 779 (BC L49)
 Three-Part Invention (Sinfonia), for keyboard No. 8 in F major, BWV 794 (BC L49)
 Two-Part Invention, for keyboard No. 10 in G major, BWV 781 (BC L51)
 Three-Part Invention (Sinfonia), for keyboard No. 10 in G major, BWV 796 (BC L51)
 Two-Part Invention, for keyboard No. 12 in A major, BWV 783 (BC L53)
 Three-Part Invention (Sinfonia), for keyboard No. 12 in A major, BWV 798 (BC L53)
 Two-Part Invention, for keyboard No. 15 in B minor, BWV 786 (BC L56)
 Three-Part Invention (Sinfonia), for keyboard No. 15 in B minor, BWV 801 (BC L56)
 Verschiedene Canones (14), for unspecified instruments or keyboard, BWV 1087
 Toccata and Fugue, for organ in D minor, BWV 565 (BC J37) Toccata
 Toccata and Fugue, for organ in D minor, BWV 565 (BC J37) Fugue
 Cantata No. 147, "Herz und Mund und Tat und Leben," BWV 147 (BC A174) Jesu, Joy of Man's Desiring

1985 albums
Don Dorsey albums
Telarc International Corporation albums